In Greek mythology, Syleus was a man of Aulis, Lydia killed by Heracles for his nefarious deeds. He was the father of Xenodoce.

Mythology 
In most versions Syleus owned a vineyard and forced all passers-by to dig it, which he might have attempted to do to Heracles as well. Heracles killed Syleus with the latter's own hoe and burned his vineyard down to the root. He also killed Xenodice.

According to Conon, Syleus had a brother Dicaeus; their father was Poseidon. Unlike Syleus, Dicaeus was a just man, which was suggested by the very literal meaning of his name, and received Heracles hospitably after the hero had done away with Syleus. Heracles fell in love with the daughter of Syleus, who had been raised by her uncle, and married her. Soon, however, he left and his newlywed wife missed him so much that she died of grief.  Upon return, Heracles learned of her death and was about to throw himself onto her funeral pyre, but those present at the funeral ceremony managed to dissuade him from doing so. A temple of Heracles was erected next to her tomb.

Notes

References 
 Apollodorus, The Library with an English Translation by Sir James George Frazer, F.B.A., F.R.S. in 2 Volumes, Cambridge, MA, Harvard University Press; London, William Heinemann Ltd. 1921. . Online version at the Perseus Digital Library. Greek text available from the same website.
Conon, Fifty Narrations, surviving as one-paragraph summaries in the Bibliotheca (Library) of Photius, Patriarch of Constantinople translated from the Greek by Brady Kiesling. Online version at the Topos Text Project.
 Diodorus Siculus, The Library of History translated by Charles Henry Oldfather. Twelve volumes. Loeb Classical Library. Cambridge, Massachusetts: Harvard University Press; London: William Heinemann, Ltd. 1989. Vol. 3. Books 4.59–8. Online version at Bill Thayer's Web Site
 Diodorus Siculus, Bibliotheca Historica. Vol 1-2. Immanel Bekker. Ludwig Dindorf. Friedrich Vogel. in aedibus B. G. Teubneri. Leipzig. 1888–1890. Greek text available at the Perseus Digital Library.
 John Tzetzes, Book of Histories, Book II-IV translated by Gary Berkowitz from the original Greek of T. Kiessling's edition of 1826.  Online version at theio.com

Adaptations 
 A. Rozokoki, Euripides' Syleus, satyric. A reconstruction (for theatrical performance), 2019 (in Greek)

Children of Poseidon
Demigods in classical mythology
Mythology of Heracles